Bradley Angle is a nonprofit organization based in Portland, Oregon, United States. It was founded in 1975 as the first domestic violence shelter on the West Coast. The City of Portland presented the organization with a Spirit of Portland award in 2012.

References

External links

 

1975 establishments in Oregon
Domestic violence-related organizations in the United States
Non-profit organizations based in Oregon
Organizations based in Portland, Oregon
Organizations established in 1975